Rolf Sennewald (born 4 April 1937) is a retired German weightlifter. He competed in the light-heavyweight category at the 1960 Summer Olympics and shared 11th place.

References

1937 births
Living people
German male weightlifters
Olympic weightlifters of the United Team of Germany
Weightlifters at the 1960 Summer Olympics